José Luis García Sánchez (born 22 September 1941) is a Spanish film director, screenwriter and producer. He has directed 30 films since 1968. He wrote for the 1973 film Habla, mudita, which was entered into the 23rd Berlin International Film Festival. In 1978, he directed Las truchas ("Trouts"), which won the Golden Bear at the 28th Berlin International Film Festival.

Selected filmography
 Habla, mudita (1973)
 Las truchas (1978)
 Tramway to Malvarrosa (Tranvía a la Malvarrosa) (1997)
 Hay que deshacer la casa (1983)
 La corte de Faraón (1985)
 Divinas palabras (1987)
 The Flight of the Dove (1989)
 La noche más larga (1991)
 Belle Époque (1992)
 Lázaro de Tormes (2001)
 La marcha verde'' (2002)

References

External links

1941 births
Living people
Spanish film directors
Spanish male screenwriters
Spanish film producers
People from Salamanca
Directors of Golden Bear winners